The Reconstruction Finance Corporation was a government corporation administered by the United States Federal Government between 1932 and 1957 that provided financial support to state and local governments and made loans to banks, railroads, mortgage associations, and other businesses. Its purpose was to boost the country's confidence and help banks resume daily functions after the start of the Great Depression. The RFC became more prominent under the New Deal and continued to operate through World War II. It was disbanded in 1957, when the US Federal Government concluded that it no longer needed to stimulate lending.

The RFC was an independent agency of the US Federal Government, and fully owned and operated by the government. The idea was suggested by Eugene Meyer of the Federal Reserve Board of Governors, recommended by President Herbert Hoover, and established by Congress in 1932. It was modeled after the US War Finance Corporation of World War I. In total, it gave US$2 billion in aid to state and local governments and made many loans, nearly all of which were repaid.

The agency played a major role in recapitalizing banks in the 1930s and it was effective in reducing bank failures and stimulating bank lending. It also helped to set up relief programs that were taken over by the New Deal in 1933.

History
There was no federal agency that could make massive loans to critical sectors of the depressed economy. To address these problems, President Herbert Hoover asked and Congress passed the Reconstruction Finance Corporation Act of 1932 with broad bipartisan support. Hoover  signed the Act into law on January 22. Like the Federal Reserve, the RFC would loan to banks, but it was designed to serve state-chartered banks and small banks in rural areas that were not part of the Federal Reserve System. Another distinction was that the RFC could make loans on the basis of collateral that the Federal Reserve and other lenders would not accept. The related Banking Act of 1932, signed on February 27, broadened the Federal Reserve's lending powers, and gave it the power to make national policy to mitigate the problems with the economy. Eugene Meyer, who had pushed for both pieces of legislation, after heading up an organization similar to the RFC during World War I, was a governor of the Federal Reserve, and chairman of the Board of the RFC.  Essentially, the RFC was the "discount lending" arm of the Federal Reserve.

The initial funding for the RFC came from the sale of US$500 million worth of stocks and bonds to the United States Treasury. To obtain more capital, it sold US$1.5 billion in bonds to the Treasury, which then sold them to the general public. In its first couple of years, the RFC needed a loan of US$51.3 billion from the Treasury and US$3.1 billion from the public.

The RFC lent to solvent institutions that could not be sold to repay their existing liabilities but would be able to do so in the long run. A main reason for such loans was to ensure that depositors got their money back. The Reconstruction Finance Corporation spent US$1.5 billion in 1932, US$1.8 billion in 1933, and US$1.8 billion in 1934 before dropping to about US$350 million a year. In August 1939, on the eve of World War II, it greatly expanded to build munitions factories. In 1941, it disbursed US$1.8 billion. The total loaned or otherwise disbursed by the RFC from 1932 through 1941 was US$9.465 billion.

Chairmen of the Board of Directors

Administrators and Deputy Administrators

Under President Herbert Hoover
The first RFC president was the former US Vice President Charles Dawes. He soon resigned to attend to his bank in Chicago, which was in danger of failing, and President Herbert Hoover appointed Atlee Pomerene of Ohio to head the agency in July 1932. The presidency of the RFC thus switched from a Republican to a Democrat. Hoover's reasons for reorganizing the RFC included: the broken health and resignations of Eugene Meyer, Paul Bestor, and Charles Dawes; the failure of banks to perform their duties to their clientele or to aid American industry; the country's general lack of confidence in the current board; and Hoover's inability to find any other man who had the ability and was both nationally respected and available. (Shriver 1982)
   
Like the Federal Reserve, the RFC tended to bail out the banks that benefited the public the most. Butkiewicz (1995) shows that the RFC initially succeeded in reducing bank failures, but the publication of the names of loan recipients beginning in August 1932 (at the demand of Congress) significantly reduced its effectiveness, because it appeared that political considerations had motivated certain loans. Partisan politics hindered the RFC's efforts, though in 1932, monetary conditions improved because the RFC slowed the decline in the nation's money supply.

The original legislation establishing the RFC did not limit it to lending to financial institutions; it was also authorized to provide loans for railroad construction and crop lands. An amendment passed in July 1932 allowed the RFC to provide loans to state and municipal governments. The purpose of these loans was to finance projects like dams and bridges, and the money would be repaid by charging fees to use these structures. To help with unemployment, a relief program was created that would be repaid by tax receipts.

Under President Franklin D. Roosevelt
President Franklin D. Roosevelt, who took office in 1933, increased the RFC's funding, streamlined the bureaucracy, and used it to help restore business prosperity, especially in banking and railroads. He appointed Texas banker Jesse H. Jones to lead the agency, and Jones turned the RFC into an empire with loans made in every state.

Under the New Deal, the powers of the RFC were greatly expanded. The agency now purchased bank stock and extended loans for agriculture, housing, exports, businesses, governments, and disaster relief. Roosevelt soon directed the RFC to buy gold to change its market price. The original legislation did not call for identities of the banks receiving loans nor of any reports to Congress. This, however, was changed in July 1932 to make the RFC transparent. Bankers soon were hesitant to ask the RFC for a loan since the public would become aware and begin to consider the possibility of their bank failing causing them to withdraw their deposits, a practice called bank running.

The RFC also had a division that gave the states loans for emergency relief needs. In a case study of Mississippi, Vogt (1985) examined two areas of RFC funding: aid to banking, which helped many Mississippi banks survive the economic crisis, and work relief, which Roosevelt used to pump money into the state's relief program by extending loans to businesses and local government projects. Although charges of political influence and racial discrimination were levied against RFC activities, the agency made positive contributions and established a federal agency in local communities which provided a reservoir of experienced personnel to implement expanding New Deal programs.

Roosevelt saw this corporation as an advantage to the national government. The RFC could finance projects without Congress approving them and the loans would not be included in budget expenditures. Soon the RFC was able to buy bank preferred stock with the Emergency Banking Act of 1933. Buying stock would serve as collateral when banks needed loans. This, however, was somewhat controversial because if the RFC was a shareholder than it could interfere with salaries and bank management. The Federal Deposit Insurance Corporation (FDIC) was later created to help decrease bank failures and insure bank deposits. The second main assistance was to farmers and their crop lands. The Commodity Credit Corporation was established to provide assistance. The agriculture was hit hard with a drought and machinery like the tractor. One benefit it provided to these rural cities was the Electric Home and Farm Authority, which provided electricity and gas and assistance in buying appliances to use these services.

The mortgage company was affected as well since families were not able to make their payments. This led the RFC to create its own mortgage company to sell and insure mortgages. The Federal National Mortgage Association (also known as Fannie Mae) was established and funded by the RFC. It later became a private corporation. An Export–Import Bank was also created to encourage trade with the Soviet Union. Another bank was established to fund trade with all other foreign nations a month later. They eventually merged and make loans available to exports. Roosevelt wanted to reduce the gold value of the US dollar. In order to accomplish this, the RFC purchased large amounts of gold until a price floor was set.

World War II

The RFC's powers, which had grown even before World War II began, further expanded during the war. President Roosevelt merged the RFC and the Federal Deposit Insurance Corporation (FDIC), which was one of the landmarks of the New Deal. Oscar Cox, a primary author of the Lend-Lease Act and general counsel of the Foreign Economic Administration, joined as well. Lauchlin Currie, formerly of the Federal Reserve Board staff, was the deputy administrator to Leo Crowley.
The RFC established eight new corporations and purchased an existing corporation. Its eight wartime subsidiaries were the Metals Reserve Company, Rubber Reserve Company, Defense Plant Corporation, Defense Supplies Corporation, War Damage Corporation, US Commercial Company, Rubber Development Corporation, and Petroleum Reserve Corporation. These corporations helped fund the development of synthetic rubber, the construction and operation of a tin smelter, and the establishment of abaca (Manila hemp) plantations in Central America. Both natural rubber and abaca (used to produce rope products) had been produced primarily in South Asia, which came under Japanese control during the war. The RFC's programs encouraged the development of alternative sources of these materials. Synthetic rubber, which was not produced in the United States prior to the war, quickly became the primary source of rubber in the postwar years.

The War Insurance Corporation was established December 13, 1941 by Act of June 10, 1941 (55 Stat. 249), was renamed the War Damage Corporation by Act of March 27, 1942 (56 Stat. 175), and its charter filed March 31, 1942. It had been created by the Federal Loan Administrator with the approval of the President of the United States pursuant to §5(d) of the Reconstruction Finance Corporation Act or 1932, 15 USCA §606(b) for the purpose of providing insurance covering damage to property of American nationals not otherwise available from private insurers arising from "enemy attack including by the military, naval of air forces of the United States in resisting enemy attack". Prior to July 1, 1942, the War Damage Corporation provided for such insurance without compensation, but by express Congressional enactment Congress added §5(g) to the Reconstruction Finance Corporation Act, 15 USCA §606(b)(2) requiring that on and after July 1, 1942, the War Damage Corporation should issue insurance policies upon the payment of annual premiums. Under the terms of War Damage Corporation's charter an authorized capital stock of US$100,000,000 was provided, all of which was subscribed for by the Reconstruction Finance Corporation.

The corporation was transferred from the Federal Loan Agency to the Department of Commerce by Executive Order #9071 of February 24, 1942, returned to the Federal Loan Agency by Act of February 24, 1945 (59 Stat. 5), and abolished by Act of June 30, 1947 (61 Stat. 202) with its functions assumed by Reconstruction Finance Corporation. The powers of War Damage Corporation, except for purposes of liquidation, terminated as of January 22, 1947.

From 1941 through 1945, the RFC authorized over US$2 billion of loans and investments each year, with a peak of over US$6 billion authorized in 1943. The magnitude of RFC lending had increased substantially during the war.

The Petroleum Reserves Corporation was transferred to the Office of Economic Warfare, which was consolidated into the Foreign Economic Administration, which was transferred to the Reconstruction Finance Corporation and changed to the War Assets Corporation. The War Assets Corporation was dissolved after March 25, 1946. Most lending to wartime subsidiaries ended in 1945, and all such lending ended in 1948.

World War II aircraft disposal

After the war, the Reconstruction Finance Corporation established five large storage, sales, and scrapping centers for Army Air Forces aircraft. These were located at Kirtland Air Force Base in Albuquerque, New Mexico; Altus Air Force Base in Oklahoma; Kingman Air Force Base in Arizona; Ontario Air Force Base in California; and Walnut Ridge Air Force Base in Arkansas. A sixth facility for storing, selling, and scrapping Navy and Marine aircraft was located in Clinton, Oklahoma.

Estimates of the number of excess surplus airplanes ran as high as 150,000. By the summer of 1945, at least 30 sales-storage depots and 23 sales centers were in operation. In November 1945, it was estimated that a total of 117,210 aircraft would be transferred as surplus.

Between 1945 and June 1947, the RFC, the War Assets Corporation, and the War Assets Administration (the disposal function of the RFC was transferred to WAC on January 15, 1946, and to the WAA in March 1946) processed approximately 61,600 World War II aircraft, of which 34,700 were sold for flyable purposes and 26,900, primarily combat types, were sold for scrapping.

Most of the transports and trainers could be used in the civil fleet, and trainers were sold for US$875 to US$2,400. The fighters and bombers were of little peacetime use (outside of warbird preservation and aviation museums, and some early use for aerial firefighting in later decades) although some were sold. Typical prices for surplus aircraft were:

 Vultee BT-13 Valiant US$450
 Lockheed P-38 Lightning US$1,250
 North American AT-6  US$1,500
 Douglas A-26 Invader  US$2,000
 North American P-51 Mustang  US$3,500
 North American B-25 Mitchell   US$8,250
 Boeing B-17 Flying Fortress   US$13,750
 Consolidated B-24 Liberator  US$13,750
 Consolidated B-32 Dominator US$32,500

Many aircraft were transferred to communities or schools for memorial use for a minimal fee or even for free. A Boy Scout troop bought a B-17 Flying Fortress for US$350.

General sales were conducted from these centers; however, the idea for long-term storage, considering the approximate cost of US$20 per month per aircraft, was soon discarded, and in June 1946, the remaining aircraft, except those at Altus, were put up for scrap bid. By 1964, this role had been taken up by the USAF's 309th Aerospace Maintenance and Regeneration Group, based at Davis–Monthan Air Force Base as the sole repository for obsolete and surplus American  airborne ordnance systems, for the Department of Defense.

Disbanding
After World War II ended, the type of loans provided by the RFC were no longer in demand. During the late 1940s RFC made a large loan to Northwest Orient Airlines earmarked for the purchase of ten Boeing Stratocruiser airliners. The loan became controversial, seen as a political favor to the Boeing Corporation, who supported the re-election campaign of President Harry S. Truman, and sparked a congressional inquiry. President Dwight D. Eisenhower was in office when legislation terminated the RFC. It was "abolished as an independent agency by act of Congress (1953) and was transferred to the Department of the Treasury to wind up its affairs, effective June 1954. It was totally disbanded in 1957." The Small Business Administration was established to provide loans to small business, and training programs were created. Several federal agencies took over RFC assets, and the tin and abaca programs were handled by General Services Administration. The Commodity Credit Corporation, which was created to help farmers, remained in operation. Another establishment kept in operation is the Export–Import Bank, which encourages exports.

In 1991, Rep. Jamie L. Whitten (Democrat of Mississippi) introduced a bill to reestablish the RFC, but it did not receive a hearing by a congressional committee, and he did not reintroduce the bill in subsequent sessions.

See also
 Resolution Trust Corporation
 Federal Emergency Management Agency
 Emergency Relief and Construction Act

References

Bibliography

 detailed memoir by longtime chairman
 shows how RFC financed many war plants

External links
 Oral History Interview with Hubert F. Havlik, Truman Presidential Library, June 20, 1973.
 Records of the Reconstruction Finance Corporation

 
1957 disestablishments in the United States
Agencies of the United States government during World War II
Corporations chartered by the United States Congress
Defunct agencies of the United States government
Government agencies established in 1932
United States government-sponsored enterprises
Herbert Hoover
New Deal agencies
1932 establishments in the United States
Government agencies disestablished in 1957
National development banks